Capterra, Inc. is a free online marketplace vendor serving as an intermediary between buyers and technology vendors within the software industry. The company assists consumers with selecting software for their needs with user reviews and research.

History 

The company was founded in 1998 by Michael Ortner and Rakesh Chilakapati. It is based in Arlington, Virginia. The company uses a pay-per-click model. Vendors can bid on the basis of software category & listing position. All these platforms have paid listing as well as organic listings based on reviews. Capterra was on the list of the Inc. magazine's 2007 ranking of the 5000 fastest-growing private U.S. companies. By the end of 2007, there were nearly 10,000 software vendors advertised on the website. In 2009, the site allowed software users to leave reviews.

In September 2015, Capterra was acquired by Gartner for $206.2 million and became a part of its strategy to expand its business within the software industry. It is reported that Vista Point Advisors acted as a financial advisor to Capterra before and during the transition to Gartner.

In 2018 Capterra conducted a Top Tech trends survey  on how small businesses manage technology investments  and consider project management software. In August 2019, Capterra is reported to have delivered 1 million software reviews on its platform.

In 2020, Capterra conducted a series of surveys to analyze the impact of the COVID-19 pandemic on the software business including digital payments and tech industry employment.

Industry recognition

 Inc. 5000 Fastest Growing Private Business 2007-2009
 Radius.com Best B2B Holiday Campaigns 2013
 Interactive Media Award for Outstanding Achievement in the Software Industry, 2008 and 2009
 Ranked #25 on Virginia Chamber of Commerce Fantastic 50, 2007

See also

 Business-to-business
 Pay per click

References

External links
 
Official Capterra Australia 
Official Capterra UK 
Official Capterra Ireland

American review websites
Companies based in Virginia
Information technology consulting firms of the United States
Software companies established in 1999